Edward Docx (born 1972) is a British writer. His first novel, The Calligrapher, was published in 2003. He is an associate editor of New Statesman Magazine.

Biography

Docx was born in Newcastle. He was educated at St Bede's College in Manchester and then at Christ's College, Cambridge, where he read English Literature and was President of the JCR.

His mother was a classical music agent and he has described his upbringing as eccentric. He is the eldest son of a family of seven children. He lives in London.

Works

Docx's first novel, The Calligrapher (2003), was short-listed for both the William Saroyan prize and the Guilford Prize. The San Francisco Chronicle called it the best debut book of the year.

This was followed by Pravda (2007, entitled Self Help in the UK), which was long-listed for the Man-Booker Prize (2007) and won the Geoffrey Faber Memorial Prize (2007).

His third novel was The Devil's Garden (2011).

His fourth novel, Let Go My Hand, was published in April 2017 (also by Picador).

Docx's work is often extremely well received by critics in the UK and America. The New York Times has described him as 'fiendishly clever' and the Independent as a 'virtuoso phrasemaker' and one of the most humane writers of his generation. Docx was cited as one of the 21 most gifted young writers from around the world by The Hay Festival Committee (2008).

Docx also works as a screenwriter for television and film. He has co-written several film scripts with the Australian director P.J. Hogan and has worked variously with Ringside Productions, Rainmark and Mandabach on television drama in the UK.

Docx co-writes the Swift and Hawk series of children's books with Matthew Plampin under the pen name Logan Macx. The first book in the series, Swift and Hawk: Cyberspies, was published in 2022.

Themes and style

Docx has been compared to writers as diverse as Dickens, Dostoyevsky and Coetzee. And his writing is often praised for its descriptive skill. His work is chiefly noted for its vitality and the attention given to character as well as style. A review in The New Yorker says "Docx has a gift for assessing “the exact shape and weight of other people’s inner selves, the architecture of their spirit” and even his most ancillary characters flare into being, vital and insistent."

Journalism

Docx has contributed to British and American newspapers and magazines. In the UK, his journalism most often appears in the Guardian, the New Statesman  or Prospect magazine. Docx was short-listed for The George Orwell Prize for Journalism in 2012. He was short-listed in 2014 for the Foreign Press Association Feature of the Year. In 2015, he was again long-listed for the George Orwell Rowntree Prize. And for a third time for the Orwell-Rowntree in 2021. He has worked in The House of Commons and has interviewed several of the British party political leaders.

Newspaper, radio and television work

Docx reviews contemporary fiction for the Guardian. He has also worked extensively on television and radio. He presented his own show for BBC Television and BBC Radio. He has written widely on the cultural importance of literature and is a regular teacher of the Guardian's Masterclass series on fiction.

Politics

Docx campaigned publicly for the UK to remain in the European Union.

References

External links
Official website

People educated at St Bede's College, Manchester
1972 births
Alumni of Christ's College, Cambridge
Living people
People from Hale, Greater Manchester